Duel in Dakar (French: Duel à Dakar) is a 1951 French film directed by Georges Combret and Claude Orval and starring Maurice Régamey, Pierre Cressoy and Lysiane Rey.

Cast
 Maurice Régamey as Robert Vernier  
 Pierre Cressoy as M. Pascal  
 Lysiane Rey as Monique Gambier  
 François Patrice as Julien Gambier  
 Irène de Trebert as Irène  
 Alexandre Rignault as Martinzal  
 René Blancard as Doirel, chef du S.R.  
 Raoul Marco as Vaminy  
 Jean Gaven as Fred  
 Jacques Dynam as Reinard  
 Michel Flamme as Martin  
 Paul Azaïs as Marco
 Maria Aranda 
 Paul Bonifas as Le commandant  
 Jean Clarieux as L'agent  
 Fransined as Jimmy  
 Robert Le Béal as Max  
 René Lebrun 
 Raymond Raynal as Bertrand  
 Émile Riandreys as Le barman 
 Jean Thielment as Charley  
André Wasley

References

Bibliography 
 Philippe Rège. Encyclopedia of French Film Directors, Volume 1. Scarecrow Press, 2009.

External links 
 

1951 films
1950s French-language films
Films directed by Georges Combret
Films directed by Claude Orval
Films set in Senegal
French black-and-white films
1950s French films